The 2011–12 Rotor Volgograd season was the 6th season that the club played in the Russian Second Division.

Squad 

 (captain)

Transfers

Winter 2010–11

In:

Out:

Summer

In:

Out:

Winter 2011–12

In:

Out:

Competitions

Friendlies

Russian Second Division

Table

Russian Cup

Statistics

Squad Statistics

League

Minutes Played

    
    
    
    
    • Player in Application    * Player Dismissed from Field

Goal scorers

Discipline

All Tournaments

Appearances and goals

|-
|colspan="14"|Players who completed the season with other clubs:

|}

Top Scorers

Disciplinary Record

Team Statistics

General Statistics

References

FC Rotor Volgograd seasons
Rotor